Camponotus gibber is a species of carpenter ant (genus Camponotus) found in Madagascar.

References

gibber
Insects described in 1891
Hymenoptera of Africa